Tondikiwindi is a village and rural commune in Niger. It administers the villages of Tchoma Bangou and Zaroumadareye.

The village of Tongo Tongo is located in this commune. The Tongo Tongo ambush of US soldiers by ISIS affiliated group occurred here on 4 October 2017.

References

Communes of Tillabéri Region